Marion Grupe is an East German sprint canoer who competed in the early 1970s. She won a bronze medal in the K-4 500 m event at the 1971 ICF Canoe Sprint World Championships in Belgrade.

References

East German female canoeists
Living people
Year of birth missing (living people)
ICF Canoe Sprint World Championships medalists in kayak